Eureka Seven is an anime series created and produced by Bones and directed by Tomoki Kyoda. The series ran for a total of fifty episodes, as well as a recap special titled "Navigation ray=out", which recaps the first half of the series. The first episode aired in Japan on April 17, 2005, and the final episode on April 2, 2006. The series was later picked up by Adult Swim for the United States market and began airing on April 16, 2006. Adult Swim aired the last episode on April 29, 2007, replacing Eureka's dialogue and the final scene with Axel and the children with the shortened regular opening and ending themes. A week later on May 6, they re-aired the episode with the original opening and ending content intact after complaints from viewers.

Almost all of the series' episode titles correspond to real songs, composed by Japanese or foreign artists. Some of these have been stated to be intentional references (including "Blue Monday"), and other phrases previously only existed as song titles.


Episode list

References 
 

Eureka Seven
Episodes